Ion Țeposu (born 24 January 1943) is a Romanian biathlete. He competed in the relay event at the 1972 Winter Olympics.

References

1943 births
Living people
People from Brașov County
Romanian male biathletes
Olympic biathletes of Romania
Biathletes at the 1972 Winter Olympics